Michael Kenneth Munday (born 22 October 1984 in Nottingham) is an English cricketer who played for Somerset until 2010. He is a leg break bowler and lower order right-handed batsman.

He made his Minor Counties debut for Cornwall while playing for Truro School in 2001 and played for them regularly in 2001 and 2002 before playing in the Somerset 2nd XI in late 2002. He played for Oxford University from 2003 to 2006 playing each season in the Varsity match against Cambridge University. His debut First-class match was for Oxford against Middlesex in which his first wickets were future England internationals, Andrew Strauss and Owais Shah.

In 2004, he played two Under-19 Test matches against Bangladesh alongside Somerset team-mate James Hildreth, under the captaincy of opener Alastair Cook. In the 2006 match against Cambridge, he took 11–143 and made his highest first-class innings of 17* enabling Oxford to win by 9 wickets. He made his first-class for Somerset debut in 2005 and also played for them in 2006 although he has yet to become a regular member of the team.

During the 2006 winter season, Munday played A-grade cricket for the Glenelg Cricket Club in Adelaide, Australia where he continued his tuition with leg-spin coach Terry Jenner. Munday's best first-class bowling occurred for Somerset against Nottinghamshire in September 2007 taking 8–55 from 16 overs in the second innings having never taken more than 3 wickets in a championship innings before. He finished with match figures of 10–65. Marcus Trescothick stated after this match that Munday "could be the x factor in helping us win the championship title next season". In August 2010, Somerset's Director of Cricket, Brian Rose announced that Munday's contract would not be renewed for the 2011 season.

References

External links

Somerset County Cricket Club Pen Picture

1984 births
Living people
Alumni of Corpus Christi College, Oxford
Cornwall cricketers
Cricketers from Nottingham
English cricketers of the 21st century
English cricketers
Oxford MCCU cricketers
Oxford University cricketers
People educated at Truro School
Somerset cricketers